Den Haag Centraal (English: "The Hague Central") is the largest railway station in the city of The Hague in South Holland, Netherlands, and with twelve tracks, the largest terminal station in the Netherlands. The railway station opened in 1973, adjacent to its predecessor: Den Haag Staatsspoor, which was subsequently demolished. It is the western terminus of the Gouda–Den Haag railway.

History 

The oldest station in The Hague is Den Haag Hollands Spoor, opened in 1843 by the Hollandsche IJzeren Spoorweg-Maatschappij when the railway between Amsterdam and Leiden was extended to The Hague and Rotterdam. This station was located at some distance from the city centre, just across what was then the municipal boundary of Rijswijk. In 1870, the Nederlandsche Rhijnspoorweg-Maatschappij (NRS) opened a second station in The Hague closer to the city centre. This station, Den Haag Rijnspoor, would service eastbound trains to Gouda and Utrecht. When the NRS was nationalised in 1890, this Gouda–Den Haag railway became the property of the Maatschappij tot Exploitatie van Staatsspoorwegen, and the station was renamed Den Haag Staatsspoor.

Den Haag Staatsspoor was a small building designed by A.W. van Erkel situated parallel to the railway, with the entrance facing sideways toward the city centre. This was designed to facilitate an extension of the railway to Scheveningen, which was constructed in 1907 but closed again in 1953. Staatsspoor was connected to Hollands Spoor and the Amsterdam–Haarlem–Rotterdam railway for passengers in the late 19th century, but that connection, too, was later discontinued.

In 1962, urban designer David Jokinen saw an opportunity to put an end to the situation with two main stations where Staatsspoor and Hollands Spoor each served only part of the rail traffic. The Jokinen Plan included demolishing the Staatsspoor station entirely. The railway from Utrecht and Gouda would terminate at Hollands Spoor, which would then become the city's central railway station. The demolition of the railway to Staatsspoor, meanwhile, would make space for an urban motorway and a monorail line. However, the plan was never realised.

In the 1960s, Nederlandse Spoorwegen planned for The Hague to get a central railway station. While it initially intended to rebuild Hollands Spoor into a central railway station, The municipality of The Hague resisted this plan because it preferred a location closer to the city centre so that government buildings would be more accessible. Moreover, the buildings around Hollands Spoor provided little space for expansion of tracks and platforms in the future. It was therefore decided that a new station would be built next to Staatsspoor. With plans for an extension of the railway to Scheveningen definitively cancelled, this new station would become the terminal station of the Gouda–Den Haag railway. Construction started in 1970, and on 27 September 1973, the construction had advanced enough to allow for the opening a number of platforms. Trains previously headed for Staatsspoor were transferred to Centraal Station, and the now-redundant Staatsspoor was demolished in the same year. The bus platform was opened in 1975, and construction of Centraal Station finalised in 1976 with the opening of its tram station. The train station was officially opened on 28 May of that year. A chord to connect the station to Den Haag Laan van NOI and the railway to Amsterdam was also completed in 1975, while a chord to connect it to Den Haag Hollands Spoor and the railway to Rotterdam was completed the following year. This ensured that trains coming from north, east and south could all reach Den Haag Centraal.

Although Centraal station is the largest station in The Hague, it is served only by terminating trains; Intercity and international trains travelling between Amsterdam and Rotterdam stop only at Hollands Spoor station. Now, The Hague is the only city in the Netherlands which still has two major railway stations.

By the 2010s, the number of travellers per day had grown to 190,000, and Den Haag Centraal had outgrown its capacity. In order to increase the station's capacity, a renovation of its main hall was started in 2011. The roof was replaced by one which is higher, and made of diamond-shaped glass plates placed in a framework of stainless steel. Moreover, more commercial space was added next to both side entrances, and new tiling was placed. The new main hall was opened by State Secretary Sharon Dijksma and mayor Jozias van Aartsen on 1 February 2016.

Train services 

There are 22 scheduled trains per hour that leave Den Haag Centraal on a normal weekday (07:00 - 20:00). Sprinter services call at every station along the way whilst Intercity trains only stop at the major stations.
There are 6 trains an hour (each way) connecting Den Haag Centraal with Rotterdam Centraal, 6 trains an hour connecting it with Utrecht and 4 with Amsterdam.

Other transport

Tram services
Den Haag Centraal is a public transport hub and a major nodal hub for the tram network run by HTM Personenvervoer. The railway station features two separate sets of platforms.

Upper tram station
These are two elevated island platforms serving four tracks, located above and lying perpendicular to the heavy rail tracks, serving lines 2, 3, 4, and 6. Regular lines 2 and 6 use the inner tracks, while the RandstadRail lines 3 and 4 use the outer tracks. They connect directly to the city centre tunnel to the west and the elevated tracks to Ternoot and Beatrixkwartier to the east.

Lower tram station
These are two ground-level side platforms and one island platform between them, located parallel to the heavy rail tracks outside the south-western entrance. All other city tram lines that call at the station use these platforms.

Metro services

The Rotterdam-based RET operates RandstadRail line E, a high-capacity metro service via Leidschenveen and Pijnacker to Rotterdam Centraal station. From there it shares track with line D of the Rotterdam Metro and terminates at Slinge station.

Until August 2016, these services used platforms 11 and 12 of the mainline station, alongside the heavy rail tracks. Since then, two dedicated elevated platforms have come into use. Here, metro trains use the high-level side platforms; the low-level island platform is used by RandstadRail trams in case of emergency, when the connecting tracks via Beatrixkwartier cannot be used.

Bus services
There is a bus platform above the rail roads, which is connected to the Prins Bernhardviaduct running over the tracks. The platform is accessible from the station's main hall. Several city and regional lines of three different carriers stop here. HTM's bus lines starting with an N are night buses and only run on Fridays and Saturdays.

See also 
Zebra clock

References

External links 

 
 Live departure times and cancellations
 Dutch Public Transport journey planner
 HTM Personenvervoer

Centraal
Railway stations opened in 1973
RandstadRail stations in The Hague